Singapore–Vietnam relations refer to the bilateral relations between the Republic of Singapore and the Socialist Republic of Vietnam. Singapore and Vietnam started the trade relations in the 19th century. Due to the anti-communist policy of Singapore, Singapore supported South Vietnam before the unification of Vietnam. Singapore also started formal diplomatic relations with North Vietnam on August 1, 1973. After the unification of Vietnam, Singapore started to improve its relations with the Socialist Republic of Vietnam. Relations worsened during the Cambodian–Vietnamese War, but have improved once more after the People's Army of Vietnam withdrawal from Cambodia.

Singapore and Vietnam maintain excellent and multifaceted bilateral relations, and both countries are the members of the Association of Southeast Asian Nations (ASEAN).

History
According to chronicles, in 1330, Malay envoys of Temasek arrived northern Vietnam and were greeted by Vietnamese prince Tran Nhat Duat, who was noted as "spoke fluently the language of Temasek."

Singapore started the trade relations with Vietnam in the 19th century, which some Vietnamese ships re-exported and sold products in Singapore.

Ho Chi Minh, the first President of the Democratic Republic of Vietnam, lived in Singapore after being released by the Government of Hong Kong. Nonetheless, he was arrested by the Singapore Police Force in 1932 and was deported to Hong Kong. In December 1941, Japan attacked Singapore by using military bases in Vietnam, making the Japanese occupation of Singapore. After the Second World War, France used Singapore as a mediate to send troops and equipment to suppress the Vietnamese Independence Movement.

In early days, Singapore implemented anti-communist policy, making the Government of Singapore supported South Vietnam. When Singapore gained independence from Malaysia in 1965, South Vietnam became one of the earliest Asian nations to recognize Singapore and established diplomatic relations with it.

On August 1, 1973, Singapore established diplomatic relations with North Vietnam. In 1975, the Fall of Saigon marked the unification of Vietnam. Singapore started to improve its relations with the Socialist Republic of Vietnam. In October 1978, Phạm Văn Đồng, the Prime Minister of Vietnam, visited Singapore and became the first Prime Minister of Vietnam to visit Singapore after unification.

In December 1978, Vietnam decided to send troops to Cambodia, led to the outbreak of Cambodian–Vietnamese War. Singapore supported anti-Vietnamese resistance in Cambodia and organized an international campaign to condemn Vietnam. Singapore also did not recognize the People's Republic of Kampuchea. The two nations' relations become normalized after Vietnamese troops retreated from Cambodia in 1990 and Vietnam joined the Association of Southeast Asian Nations in 1995. Leaders of Singapore and Vietnam met frequently. In 2004, Phan Van Khai, the Prime Minister of Vietnam visited Singapore and signed the Joint Statement on the Comprehensive Cooperation Framework in the 21st century. In 2013, Lee Hsien Loong, the Prime Minister of Singapore, visited Vietnam and established Strategic Partnership relations with Vietnam. In 2015, Nguyen Tan Dung, the Prime Minister of Vietnam, visited Singapore twice for the funeral of Lee Kuan Yew, the former Minister Mentor of Singapore and the celebration activities of the 50th anniversary of Singapore.

Trade relations
According to the data from The Observatory of Economic Complexity, in the 1990s, the exported value from Singapore to Vietnam was about 1 million US dollars, and it increased to 8 billion US dollars in 2008. Although it fell afterwards, the exported value was still about 4 billion US dollars. Refined petroleum is the main product which Singapore exports to Vietnam.

In the 1990s, the exported value from Vietnam to Singapore was about US$400 million. It increased to US$2.4 billion in 2008, then fell to US$1.6 billion in 2012, then it increased again in 2013. Crude oil is the main product which Vietnam exports to Singapore.

On May 5, 1993, the Vietnam–Singapore Cooperation Commission was established. On December 6, 2005, the Ministry of Trade and Industry of Singapore and the Ministry of Industry and Trade of Vietnam signed Framework Cooperation on Vietnam–Singapore Connectivity in Singapore including 6 aspects such as finance, investment, trade and services, transportation, information and telecommunication technology, education and training. The Framework Cooperation was effective on January 23, 2006. In 2014, Singapore was the third largest foreign investor in Vietnam, which totally invested 32.7 billion US dollars and contributed to 1,300 projects. Bình Dương Province, Haiphong, Bắc Ninh Province, Quảng Ngãi Province, Hải Dương Province and Nghệ An in Vietnam have Vietnam–Singapore Industrial Parks.

On September 13, 2013, Lim Hng Kiang, the Minister for Trade and Industry of Singapore and Bui Quang Vinh, the Minister of Planning and Investment of Vietnam, hosted the 9th Singapore-Vietnam Connectivity Meeting held in Ho Chi Minh City.

Cultural relations
Since 1992, 16,000 Vietnamese officials accepted training from the Singapore Cooperation Programme, including healthcare, environment, finance, trade, productivity, public management and English training. In 2002, the Vietnam–Singapore Training Centre was established in Hanoi.

The Ministry of Education of Singapore provides scholarships to Vietnamese students who have finished their junior secondary school studies and have good performance in English and extracurricular activities.

See also
Foreign relations of Singapore
Foreign relations of Vietnam

References

External links
Embassy of Singapore in Vietnam
Consulate General of Singapore in Ho Chi Minh City
Embassy of Vietnam in Singapore

 
Vietnam
Bilateral relations of Vietnam